David Jackson is an American television director and television writer.

Since the 1980s, Jackson has amassed many credits in television. Some of his directorial credits include Swamp Thing: The Series, Lois & Clark: The New Adventures of Superman, Nash Bridges, Dark Angel, Smallville, Charmed, The District, One Tree Hill, CSI: NY, The Cape as well as directing and writing episodes for Miami Vice, 21 Jump Street, The Equalizer.

In addition, he has directed and written a number of television films, namely Death Train (1993), Night Watch (1995), The Lake (1998), Atomic Train (1999), the Disney Channel original film Buffalo Dreams'' and among other films.

References

External links

American television directors
American television writers
American male television writers
Living people
Place of birth missing (living people)
Year of birth missing (living people)